Shafiq ur Rahman (or Rehman) is a male Muslim given name. It may refer to
Shafiq-ur-Rahman, Bangladesh politician
Shafiq-ur-Rehman (humorist) (1920-2000), Pakistani humorist and Urdu short-story writer
Shafiqurrahman Barq (born 1930), Indian politician
Shafik Rehman (born 1934), Bangladeshi journalist and writer
Shafiq-Ur-Rehman Paracha, Pakistani civil servant

Arabic masculine given names